

The Akaflieg Braunschweig SB-10 Schirokko is a German two-seat high performance sailplane designed and built by students of Brunswick University. The sailplane was not intended for production.

Design
The SB-10 is a cantilever shoulder-wing monoplane with a steel-tube structure fuselage and it used the wings from the earlier SB-9 Stratus. The two crew sit in tandem in an enclosed cockpit with a Plexiglas canopy, and it is fitted with dual instrumentation. The landing gear is a sprung retractable monowheel with a tail bumper. The wingtips are interchangeable and two types can be fitted to give a 26m or 29m span. The wing center section, its main spar and wing shells of 8m length were built using carbon fiber, a first in civil aircraft structure manufacturing.

Specifications (with 29m wing)

See also

References

Notes

Bibliography

1970s German sailplanes
Akaflieg Braunschweig aircraft
Aircraft first flown in 1972
Shoulder-wing aircraft